Lal Bihari Yadav was an Indian politician and a member of Bihar Legislative Assembly of India. He represents the Laukaha constituency in Madhubani district of Bihar. Yadav was elected since 1980,1990 and 1995 as a member of Communist Party of India.

References

People from Madhubani district
Bihar MLAs 1980–1985
Bihar MLAs 1990–1995
Bihar MLAs 1995–2000
Communist Party of India politicians from Bihar
Year of birth missing
Possibly living people